Maj-Inger Klingvall (born 15 May 1946) is a Swedish Social Democratic Party politician, who has served as a member of the Riksdag, Minister of Health and Social Affairs, Minister for International Development Cooperation, and Minister for Migration. She was statsråd (a title for members of the Swedish government) from 1996 to 2002.

Biography 
Klingvall was born in Nyköping to Sven Ohlsson and Elsa Karlsson, and married Rolf Klingvall in 1967.

Klingvall became a bachelor of arts at Stockholm University in 1970 and a master's of social science degree at Linköping University in 1972.

She worked as a secretary at Östergötland County Council 1973–1975 and then at Norrköping Municipality, in 1975–1976 as secretary and 1977–1985 as political secretary. She was a member of the Norrköping City Council from 1977 to 1996. From 1986 to 1988 she was a municipal politician as a member of the municipal board and first vice chairman of the social committee with special responsibility for child, individual and family care. Klingvall was a member of the Riksdag for Östergötland County constituency from 1988 to 2002. She was a member of the Committee on Social Insurance 1991–1994 and chair of the Committee on Health and Welfare 1994–1996. She has also been a deputy in the Committee on Civil Law and the Committee on Cultural Affairs and a member of the War Delegation.

Klingvall was Minister of State in the Persson Cabinet from 1996 to 2001, first Minister for Social Security at the Ministry of Health and Social Affairs 1996–1999 and then Minister for International Development Cooperation at the Ministry for Foreign Affairs 1999–2001. For a short period after Margot Wallström's resignation in 1998, she was acting Health minister.

Klingvall was a board member of the Social Democratic Women in Sweden from 1975 and sat on the union's executive committee 1984–1995. She was a member of the Swedish Social Democratic Party board from 1990 and sat on the executive committee from 1996 to 2001.

She chose to leave the government in November 2001 after the Social Democratic Party Congress did not give her renewed confidence in the party's executive committee.

In 2010, Klingvall together with Gabriele Winai Ström published a book about female Swedish diplomats entitled Från Myrdal till Lindh: svenska diplomatprofiler.

Maj-Inger Klingvall was married to Rolf Klingvall, from 1967, but they later divorced.

References

1946 births
Living people
People from Nyköping Municipality
Members of the Riksdag from the Social Democrats
Women members of the Riksdag
Members of the Riksdag 1991–1994
Members of the Riksdag 1994–1998
Members of the Riksdag 1998–2002
21st-century Swedish women politicians
Swedish Ministers for International Development Cooperation
Swedish Ministers for Health
Swedish Ministers for Social Affairs
Women government ministers of Sweden